On October 3, 2018, seven law enforcement officers were shot and five civilians were injured in Florence, South Carolina, United States. Two officers were killed.

Incident 
On October 3, 2018, police officers arrived at the home of Fredrick Hopkins to serve a search warrant for his adopted son, Seth Hopkins, who was wanted on charges of sexual assault. At about 4:30 pm EDT [8:30 pm GMT], Frederick Hopkins allegedly opened fire at officers. According to the Richland County Sheriff, the officers were ambushed by the suspect; when three officers exited their vehicle to walk to the house, they were shot at without warning. Florence County Emergency Management Officials said reports of "shots fired and officer down" were issued and responded to at 4:37 EDT, and that the suspect had barricaded himself inside the home with an unspecified number of children. Owing to the number of rounds being fired at officers, it took officers about 30 minutes to get an armored vehicle close enough to evacuate the wounded officers.

Victims 
Two female Florence County Deputies and three Florence City Police officers were wounded, with an armored vehicle utilized as a method to rescue downed officers during the shoot-out. An individual inside the home was also shot according to local reporters, with four other civilians reported as being injured. The slain officers were identified as Sgt. Terrence Carraway, 52 years old and a 30-year veteran of the Florence Police Department, and Investigator Farrah Turner, 36 years old and a 12-year veteran of the Florence County Sheriff's Office.

Accused

Fred Hopkins 
The suspect, 74-year-old Fred Hopkins, a former lawyer who was disbarred in 1982, was arrested at the scene before being taken to the hospital for a head injury. On October 5, police charged Hopkins with one count of murder and six counts of attempted murder. A magistrate denied bond for Fred Hopkins on the murder count and the attempted murder charges so that a global bond could be applied to all charges on a later date.

Seth Hopkins 
Seth Hopkins, Fred Hopkins' adopted son, who was subject to the initial search warrant before the incident, was charged with criminal sexual conduct with a minor between the ages of 11 and 14. The warrant, released on October 11, detailed that Seth Hopkins had engaged in sexual intercourse, activity/fondling and made inappropriate comments towards a female child on several occasions between September 2017 and October 2018.
Hopkins later pled guilty to one count of criminal sexual conduct in the second degree, was sentenced to 20 years in prison, and is currently imprisoned in the Kirkland Correctional Institution.

Aftermath

Investigation 
The Richland County Sheriff's Office of Columbia, SC, took over the investigation on October 4, and 25 agents from the FBI Evidence Response Team arrived on scene to assist deputies on October 5. The Richland County Sheriff told reporters that the incident would have occurred regardless of the arresting officers' actions, stating: "The officers did absolutely nothing wrong. This was an ambush you can't prevent."

Legal proceedings

Memorials 
Two official crowdfunding campaigns for the wounded, endorsed by the South Carolina Law Enforcement Officers Association, were launched, as well as separate campaigns through the City of Florence Police Benevolent Fund and the City of Florence website. Neighborhoods utilized blue light bulbs and flags to honor the deceased and injured victims, and food deliveries were sent to the families of officers who were hospitalized. A former officer created a "thin blue line" American flag that was signed by different police departments across the country, then presented to the family of fallen officer Sgt. Carraway.

References 

2018 in South Carolina
2018 mass shootings in the United States
Deaths by firearm in South Carolina
Florence, South Carolina
Mass shootings in South Carolina
October 2018 crimes in the United States
Mass shootings in the United States